The list of fortifications in Switzerland contains fortifications from the 15th century to the end of the Cold War.

Older fortresses 
In the Middle Ages, towns were fortified with town walls in their defense. From the 19th century fortifications were built near the border at strategically important pass crossings and train tunnels.

 Basel-Kleinhüningen, former French Kleinhüningen Fortress with Rhine bridgehead on the former Schusterinsel (silted up)
 Bern
 Fortification Bellinzona
 Fortification Hauenstein
 Fortification Murten
 Dufour fortifications
 Rheinfelden (Aargau), former fortress town
 Burg Stein (Rheinfelden), former fortress town
 Munot in Schaffhausen
 Sargans Castle on the Rhine
 Solothurn, Fortress town with four artillery towers (from 1534)
 Great St Bernard Pass in Valais
 St. Gotthard, Gotthard Fortress
 Fortress St. Luzisteig in Graubünden, Museum
 Fortress Saint-Maurice, Fortress complex in the Valais, later expanded
 City fortifications of Zürich
 City fortifications of Rapperswil mit bastions and glacis, see Endingerhorn

Artillery and other fortresses of the Swiss army 

The fortresses were largely built during World War II and during Army 61 and decommissioned with Army Reform 1995 and Army XXI. The Swiss Army maintained artillery fortresses equipped with 7.5 cm, 10.5 cm turret cannon or 15 cm guns. The guns were in casemate, turrets or in rearward positions they were in embrasures.

Some have been made accessible as a museum or can be visited on request.

In addition to the artillery works, the infantry blocking points of the infantry were permanently fortified throughout Switzerland.

Aargau 

 Reuenthal / A 4263, Militärmuseum
 Rein / A 3840, P-26, Museum
 Besserstein / A 3856
 Geissberg / A 3863
 Homberg / A 3962

Basel-Landschaft 
 Reisen-Pulfisei / A 3551–53, 3556
 Artilleriestellungen Gempenplateau

Bern 
 Bödeli A 1860–1864, Museum
 Burg / A 2050
 Faulensee / A 1954, Museum
 Grimsel / A 8900
 Hentschenried / A 1953
 Jaunpass / A 1715 bis A 1718
 Krattigen / A 1952, Museum
 Legi / A 1880-L
 Mülenen / A 1970 bis A 1973
 Schmockenfluh / A 1881
 Waldbrand / A 1880, Museum

Fribourg 

 Gross Tosse / A 1750
 Euschels / A 1743
 Im Fang / A 1748

Glarus 

 Beglingen / A 6756
 Niederberg / A 6740
 Ennetberg / A 6723–6730

Graubünden-Grisons 
 Römerstrasse / A 6212
 Tschingel / A 6225, Festungsverein
 Ansstein / A 6256
 Molinära / A 6315
 Haselboden / A 6325
 Nussloch / A 6330
 Tamina / A 6370
 Trin / A 7762, Museum
 Crestawald / A 7833, Museum
 Stalusa / A 8717, Museum

Luzern 

 Mühlefluh / A 2206 bei Vitznau, Museum und «Festungshotel»

Nidwalden 

 Wissiflue / A 2250
 Fürigen / A 2255, Museum
 Kilchlidossen / A 2261
 Ursprung / A 2242
 Mueterschwanderberg / A 2288 (Blattiberg / A 2288.01, Drachenfluh / A 2288.02, Zingel / A 2288.02)

Obwalden 
 Klein-Durren / A 2287

Schaffhausen 
 Blocking points in Schaffhausen und Stein am Rhein
 Munot in Schaffhausen, Zirkularfestung

Schwyz 
 Bannwald / A 6960-63
 Barbara / A 7330 (Rigi)
 Kirchplatte / A 6970-6974
 Verena / A 7341 (Steinerberg)
 Stock / A 7345
 Halsegg / A 7351 und A 7352, Festungs- und Dufourmuseum
 Spitz / A 7347 und A 7348, Museum

Solothurn 
 Gsal / A 3557–60
 Artilleriestellungen Gempenplateau

St. Gallen 

 Fortress Sargans, Festungsraum
 Fort Heldsberg / A 5850 St. Margrethen Nähe Bodensee, Museum
 Fort Magletsch / A 6020 Wartau, Fortress Sargans, Museum
 Fort Passati / A 6375 Seeztal
 Fort Schollberg / A 6100, Trübbach, Museum
 Fort Furggels / A 6355 St. Margretenberg, Gemeinde Pfäfers, Fortress Sargans, Museum
 Artilleriewerk Tamina / A 6370, Taminaschlucht, Gemeinde Bad Ragaz
 Kastels / A 6400 Mels, Festung Sargans

Thurgau 
 Festungsgürtel Kreuzlingen, Museum

Ticino 
 Fortress Gotthard, Fortress complex
 Fort Motto Bartola (1890), Fortress St. Gotthard
 Forte Airolo (1890–1947), Fortress St. Gotthard, Museum
 Fort Hospiz (1894–1947), Fortress St. Gotthard, Museum
 San Carlo / A 8390, Gotthardfestung
 Foppa Grande / A 8370, Fortress St. Gotthard
 Sasso da Pigna / A 8385, Fortress St. Gotthard, Themenwelt «Sasso San Gottardo».
 Lona-Mondascia A 8157 (Lona-Mairano A 8158), Museum
 Grandinagia A 8444, Val Bedretto

Uri 
 Fort Bäzberg / A 8860 (1892), Fortress St. Gotthard
 Fort Bühl / A 8675 (1892), Fortress St. Gotthard
 Fort Fuchsegg / A 8630, Fortress St. Gotthard
 Gütsch / A 8685, höchstgelegene Fort Europas (Zweiter Weltkrieg), Fortress St. Gotthard
 Isleten / A 8730
 Klausenpass, / A 8744 (Klausenpass)
 Fort Stöckli, (1893–1947), höchstgelegene Festung Europas (Erster Weltkrieg), Fortress St. Gotthard
 Teufelswand / A 8675, Gotthardfestung

Valais 
 Fortress Saint-Maurice, Fortress complex
 Cindey / A 155, Fortress Saint-Maurice, Museum
 Naters / A 9000, Fortress Saint-Maurice, Museum Naters
 Commeire / A 27, Fortress Saint-Maurice, Verein Pro Forteresse
 Champex / A 46, Fortress Saint-Maurice, Museum
 Scex / A 166, Fortress Saint-Maurice, Museum
 Follatères / A 66, Fortress Saint-Maurice

Vaud 
 Champillon / A 365 Fortress Saint-Maurice, Pyromin Museum
 Chillon / A 390, Fortress Saint-Maurice
 Dailly and Savatan / A 250 und A 200, Fortress Saint-Maurice
 Petit-Mont / A 130, Fortress Saint-Maurice
 Toveyres / A 140, Fortress Saint-Maurice
 Pré-Giroud / A 577 bei Vallorbe, Museum
 Saint-George / A 641 West, A 642 Ost Col du Marchairuz
 La Tine A 1651 (links) / A 1652 (rechts)
 Braye / A 1680

Zug 

 Militärhistorische Stiftung des Kantons Zug, Museum
 Bucklen (Unterägeri), Artillery position
 Schüsselbach (Unterägeri), Artillery position

Zürich 
 Ebersberg, Rüdlingen / A 5438, Museum
 Fort Uetliberg
 Zivilschutzbunker Landenberg: Zivilschutz-Museum der Stadt Zürich, Museum

See also 
 Bunkerprozess
 Liste von Belagerungen#Frühe Neuzeit (1517–1799)

References

Sources
 This article incorporates text translated from the corresponding German Wikipedia article as of June 19, 2020.

Bibliography 
 Hansjakob Burkhardt: Gotthardfestung - Fortificazione del San Gottardo Foppa Grande, Koller Druck und Kopie, Meggen, 2004 (81 Seiten online-PDF)
 Hansjakob Burkhardt: Die Gotthardfestung "San Carlo", der Prototyp aller Artilleriewerke mit 10,5 cm Turm-Kanonen Mod 1939 L52, Meggen, 2003 (84 Seiten online-PDF)
 Leo Fabrizio: Bunkers. Infolio éditions, Gollion 2004,  GMS-Anlageliste mit Standorten (PDF; 10,9 kB)
 Christian Schwager: Falsche Chalets. Edition Patrick Frey c/o Scalo Zürich, 2004,  GMS-Anlageliste mit Standorten (PDF; 17,6 kB)

External links 
 Schweizer Festungen: Museumsfestungen
 Fort.ch: Dachorganisation für Mitgliederorganisationen, welche ehemalige Festungen der Schweizer Armee besitzen oder betreiben
 Schweizer Museumsfestungen und Militärmuseen
 Homepage der Vereinigung Ehemaliger Angehöriger des Festungswachtkorps (VEAFWK) mit der Geschichte des Festungswachtkorps

Fortifications in Switzerland